Bar Kuk (also Romanized as Bar Kūk) is a village in Sedeh Rural District, Sedeh District, Qaen County, South Khorasan Province, Iran. At the 2006 census, its population was 575, in 180 families.

References 

Populated places in Qaen County